Dolichoderus sagmanotus is a species of ant in the genus Dolichoderus. Described by Xu in 2001, the species is endemic to China.

References

Dolichoderus
Hymenoptera of Asia
Insects of China
Insects described in 2001